Yaşar is a Turkish name and surname. It may refer to:

Yaşar (name), a Turkish given name and surname, including a list of people with the name
Yaşar University, a Turkish university in Izmir, Turkey
Yaşar, Şavşat, a village in the District of Şavşat, Artvin Province, Turkey

See also

Yasar (disambiguation)
Yashar (disambiguation)
Selçuk Yaşar (Tram İzmir), light-rail station on the Karşıyaka Tram line of the Tram İzmir network